The Sword of Damocles is a 1920 British silent drama film directed by George Ridgwell and starring Jose Collins, H.V. Esmond and Claude Fleming.

Cast
 Jose Collins as Leonie Paoli
 H.V. Esmond as Hugh Maltravers
 Claude Fleming as Geoffrey Moray
 Bobby Andrews as Jack Moray
 Thomas Nesbitt as Bruce Leslie
 Chigquita de Lorenzo as Una Paioli
 Edward Sorley as Raikes
 Tom Nesbitt as Bruce Leslie

References

Bibliography
 Low, Rachael. The History of British Film (Volume 3): The History of the British Film 1914 - 1918. Routledge, 2013.

External links

1920 films
1920 drama films
British silent feature films
British drama films
Films directed by George Ridgwell
Butcher's Film Service films
1920s English-language films
1920s British films
Silent drama films